Cypra is a genus of moths in the family Geometridae.

Species
 Cypra delicatula Boisduval, 1832

References
 Cypra at Markku Savela's Lepidoptera and Some Other Life Forms
 Natural History Museum Lepidoptera genus database

Ennominae
Geometridae genera